Werner Schaufelberger (born 12 January 1935) is a Swiss sprinter. He competed in the men's 4 × 100 metres relay at the 1960 Summer Olympics.

References

1935 births
Living people
Athletes (track and field) at the 1960 Summer Olympics
Swiss male sprinters
Olympic athletes of Switzerland
Place of birth missing (living people)